The Jim Thorpe House is a historic house in Yale, Oklahoma.

In 1917, Jim Thorpe bought a small home in Yale, Oklahoma and lived there until 1923 with his wife, Iva Miller, and children, one of whom, Jim Jr., died at the age of two.  The house was bought by the Oklahoma Historical Society in 1968 and is now listed in the National Register of Historic Places.  The house is maintained by the Jim Thorpe Memorial Foundation as a small museum to Thorpe and contains related memorabilia.

Notes

External links
Address, directions
Photos and information about the museum and Jim Thorpe

Biographical museums in Oklahoma
Historic house museums in Oklahoma
Houses completed in 1916
Houses on the National Register of Historic Places in Oklahoma
Museums in Payne County, Oklahoma
Houses in Payne County, Oklahoma
Oklahoma Historical Society
National Register of Historic Places in Payne County, Oklahoma